The Roman Catholic Diocese of Xianxian/Síenhsíen is a diocese located in the city of Xianxian in the Ecclesiastical province of Beijing in China.

History

 May 30, 1856: Established as Apostolic Vicariate of Southeastern Chi-Li 直隸東南 from the Diocese of Beijing 北京
 December 3, 1924: Renamed as Apostolic Vicariate of Xianxian 獻縣
 April 11, 1946: Promoted as Diocese of Xianxian 獻縣

Leadership
 Bishops of Xianxian (Roman rite)
 Bishop Joseph Li Liangui (March 20, 2000 – Present)
 Bishop François-Xavier Zhao Zhen-sheng, S.J. (April 11, 1946 – October 15, 1968)
 Vicars Apostolic of Xianxian 獻縣 (Roman Rite)
 Bishop François-Xavier Zhao Zhen-sheng, S.J. (December 2, 1937 – April 11, 1946)
 Bishop Henri Lécroart, S.J. (December 23, 1919 – December 2, 1936)
 Vicars Apostolic of Southeastern Chi-Li 直隸東南 (Roman Rite)
 Bishop Henri Maquet, S.J. (July 20, 1901 – December 23, 1919)
 Bishop Henri-Joseph Bulté, C.M. (March 14, 1880 – October 14, 1900)
 Bishop Edouard-Auguste Dubar, S.J. (September 9, 1864 – July 1, 1878)
 Bishop Adrien-Hippolyte Languillat, S.J. (May 30, 1856 – September 9, 1864)

References

 GCatholic.org
 Catholic Hierarchy
 Diocese website (Chinese)
 UCAN Diocese Profile

See also
Imprimerie de la Mission Catholique (Sienhsien)

Roman Catholic dioceses in China
Religious organizations established in 1856
Roman Catholic dioceses and prelatures established in the 19th century
1856 establishments in China
Christianity in Hebei